"In the Meantime" is a song from the American alternative metal band Helmet's second album Meantime. It was nominated for the Grammy Award for Best Metal Performance in 1992.

Recording and production
The song was recorded by Steve Albini and later remixed by Andy Wallace. Wallace's style of mixing, which involves (among other things) triggered samples and a cleaner more polished sound, irritated Albini. Later, when in negotiations to record Nirvana's In Utero, he stipulated a clause be added to his contract stating that Wallace would not be allowed to remix the album, after he had mixed Nevermind, which was released nine months before Meantime.

Cover versions
The song was covered by Soulfly on their 2004 album Prophecy, and by Pig Destroyer on their compilation album Painter of Dead Girls. In 2018, Lamb of God covered the song and it is featured in the band's cover album Legion: XX (under their original name Burn the Priest).

Accolades

Track listing

Amphetamine Reptile Records 7" vinyl

Promo single

Rock Ahead Records 12" vinyl

Personnel

Band
 Peter Mengede - guitar
 Henry Bogdan - bass
 Page Hamilton - guitar, vocals
 John Stanier - drums

Technical crew
 Steve Albini - recording (Side A)
 Wharton Tiers - mixing (Side B), recording (Side B)
 Andy Wallace - mixing (Side A)

References

Helmet (band) songs
1992 singles
Song recordings produced by Steve Albini
1992 songs
Songs written by Page Hamilton